Saharna Nouă is a commune in Rezina District, Moldova. It is composed of three villages: Buciușca, Saharna and Saharna Nouă, located on the right side of the Dniester River.

Saharna Monastery is situated at the distance of 110 km from Chișinău city. The monastic complex is a natural reservation and carved into the cliff side.

Gallery

References

External links
Info about Saharna Nouă commune at localitati.casata.md 
Info about Saharna village 
Info about Buciușca village 

Communes of Rezina District